2007 heat wave may refer to:

2007 Asian heat wave
2007 European heat wave
2007 Eastern North American heat wave

See also
Summer 2007